Corey Alan Harris (born November 28, 1976) is a former American football defensive back who played five seasons in the National Football League (NFL) with the New Orleans Saints and Kansas City Chiefs. He first enrolled at The Citadel before transferring to the University of North Alabama. He attended Northside High School in Warner Robins, Georgia. Harris was also a member of the Rhein Fire of NFL Europe.

Early years
Harris played high school football for the Northside High School Eagles, earning all-state honors. He also competed in wrestling for the Eagles, becoming state champion and garnering all-state recognition.

College career
Harris first played college football for The Citadel Bulldogs from 1995 to 1996. He also wrestled for the Bulldogs. He then played for the North Alabama Lions from 1997 to 1998. Harris became a member of the Phi Beta Sigma fraternity as a founding charter member of the Beta Beta Alpha Chapter that was started at the University of North Alabama on December 2, 1998.

Professional career
Harris played in six games, starting one, for the NFL's New Orleans Saints from 1999 to 2000. He was allocated to NFL Europe on February 19, 2001 and played for the Rhein Fire during the 2001 season. He was released by the Saints on May 21, 2001. Harris was signed by the Kansas City Chiefs of the NFL on July 16, 2001. He appeared in 21 games for the Chiefs from 2001 to 2003.

Coaching career
Harris has held various coaching positions in football, wrestling and track and field at several high schools. Including teaching at many of these schools a well.

Personal life
Harris has worked as a teacher at various high schools.

References

External links
Just Sports Stats

1976 births
Living people
Players of American football from Jacksonville, Florida
American football defensive backs
The Citadel Bulldogs football players
The Citadel Bulldogs wrestlers
North Alabama Lions football players
New Orleans Saints players
Rhein Fire players
Kansas City Chiefs players
High school football coaches in Georgia (U.S. state)